Virdnejávri is a lake in the municipality of Kautokeino-Guovdageaidnu in Troms og Finnmark county, Norway. The  lake is a man-made lake located on the river Kautokeinoelva which flows over the Finnmarksvidda plateau. The dam at the northern end is part of the Alta Hydroelectric Power Station.

See also
List of lakes in Norway

References

Kautokeino
Reservoirs in Norway
Lakes of Troms og Finnmark